The Rio de Janeiro antbird (Cercomacra brasiliana) is a species of bird in the family Thamnophilidae. It is endemic to Brazil.

Its natural habitats are subtropical or tropical dry forests and dry savanna. It is threatened by habitat loss.

References

Cercomacra
Birds of the Atlantic Forest
Endemic birds of Brazil
Birds described in 1905
Taxonomy articles created by Polbot